Teredo portoricensis, known commonly as the Puerto Rico shipworm, is a species of wood-boring clam or shipworm, a marine bivalve mollusk in the family Teredinidae.

See also 

Fauna of Puerto Rico

References 

Endemic fauna of Puerto Rico
Molluscs described in 1924
portoricensis